Strumigenys minutula is a species of ant found in Japan and Taiwan.

References

Myrmicinae
Insects described in 1989
Hymenoptera of Asia